Marcos Antônio Elias Santos (born 25 May 1983), known as Marcos Antônio, is a Brazilian former professional footballer who played as a centre-back.

Career
Marcos António was born in Alagoinhas, Brazil.

On 21 August 2002, FC Porto signed him but loaned him to Académica in January 2003. He then played for Gil Vicente for three seasons, and then for U.D. Leiria, before joining AJ Auxerre in summer 2007.

PAOK
He signed a one-year contract on loan, but PAOK FC had an option to buy him out after its expiration. Marcos Antonio scored the first goal for PAOK in the 2008–09 Greek Superleague in his first appearance. He finished the season at PAOK and then returned to Auxerre.

In April 2009, Marcos António was diagnosed with throat cancer. He had first complained about a sore throat two months earlier, but did not discover the cause until his wife insisted that he visit an otolaryngologist.

Belenenses
In January 2010, he left Auxerre and returned to Portugal, where he signed for C.F. Os Belenenses.

Rapid București
Marcos António scored two goals in a 5–0 win against FC Petrolul Ploieşti in the Romanian Cup. He scored another goal in a 2–0 win against Sportul Studențesc in the Liga I.

1. FC Nürnberg
In June 2012, he signed a contract with 1. FC Nürnberg until 2014. He made his debut for Der Club in the DFB-Pokal against TSV Havelse. On 29 September 2012, he made his Bundesliga debut against VfB Stuttgart, but made two bad errors early in the game, and was substituted after 16 minutes. It would be the only Bundesliga appearance of his career.

Johor Darul Ta'zim
In April 2014, he signed a contract with Johor Darul Ta'zim to replace Baihakki Khaizan in their defense. He played for his new club in a home game against title rival, Pahang FA, in the FA Cup semi-final first leg, keeping the visitor's forward, Dickson Nwakaeme, at bay. He almost got his first goal for his new club, but his header on the far post was not on target.
He finally scored his first goal in the Malaysia Super League to help JDT beat Pahang 2–0 in the 36th minute.

Honours

Club
Johor Darul Ta'zim
Malaysia Super League: 2014, 2015, 2016, 2017, 2018
Malaysia Charity Shield: 2015, 2016, 2018
Malaysia FA Cup: 2016
AFC Cup: 2015
Malaysia Cup: 2017

References

External links
 
 
 

1983 births
Living people
People from Alagoinhas
Brazilian footballers
Association football defenders
Associação Académica de Coimbra – O.A.F. players
FC Porto players
FC Porto B players
C.F. Os Belenenses players
Gil Vicente F.C. players
U.D. Leiria players
AJ Auxerre players
PAOK FC players
FC Rapid București players
1. FC Nürnberg players
Johor Darul Ta'zim F.C. players
Primeira Liga players
Ligue 1 players
Super League Greece players
Liga I players
Bundesliga players
Malaysia Super League players
Brazilian expatriate footballers
Expatriate footballers in Portugal
Expatriate footballers in France
Expatriate footballers in Greece
Expatriate footballers in Romania
Expatriate footballers in Germany
Expatriate footballers in Malaysia
Brazilian expatriate sportspeople in Portugal
Brazilian expatriate sportspeople in France
Brazilian expatriate sportspeople in Greece
Brazilian expatriate sportspeople in Romania
Brazilian expatriate sportspeople in Germany
Brazilian expatriate sportspeople in Malaysia
AFC Cup winning players
Sportspeople from Bahia